The HIV/AIDS Bureau is a part of the Health Resources and Services Administration (HRSA), an agency of the United States Department of Health and Human Services. It was established to deal with the growing problem of HIV/AIDS in the United States since the early 1980s.

Overview 
HRSA drives innovation in the delivery of treatment and support services to about 530,000 uninsured and underinsured people affected by the virus, and their families.

Key facts 
 HRSA's Ryan White HIV/AIDS Program, with a budget of more than $2.1 billion (FY 2008), funds primary health care, support services and life-sustaining medications for about half of the estimated 1.1 million people living with HIV/AIDS in the United States.
 The Ryan White HIV/AIDS Treatment Modernization Act of 2006 directs that more funds be spent on "core services" (medical, dental and prescription assistance), rather than such support functions as housing and transportation. The new law also allows the U.S. Secretary of Health and Human Services greater flexibility in reallocating funds to respond to changes in the course of the epidemic.
 The AIDS Drug Assistance Program (ADAP) is the fastest growing grant component in Ryan White. First funded in FY 1996 at $52 million, state-run ADAPs today receive $808.5 million to provide antiretroviral medications to patients who cannot afford them. On average, more than 158,000 clients receive their prescriptions annually through ADAP.
 Almost three-quarters of Ryan White patients are minorities, who have higher rates of HIV infection and are more likely to reside in areas with a shortage of health professionals, screening facilities and treatment centers. Providing HIV-testing, early diagnosis and ongoing care is made more difficult by the relative scarcity of health services in these communities, as well as social attitudes related to the disease and means of transmission.

History 

The original Ryan White Program was enacted in 1990 to improve the quality and availability of care for people with HIV/AIDS and their families. It was reauthorized in 1996, 2000 and 2006. Another reauthorization was due in 2009.

The HIV/AIDS Bureau was created in 1997, consolidating functions that had previously been dispersed among four other bureaus of HRSA.

Ryan White HIV/AIDS Program 

The Ryan White HIV/AIDS Program provides primary medical care—including dentistry—and support services to individuals living with the disease who lack health insurance or personal financial resources to pay for their own care. For most, it is the "program of last resort", covering those who do not qualify for any other health benefits program, including Medicare or Medicaid.

While clinical care and support services are the primary focus of the program, Ryan White also funds training and technical assistance for medical professionals as well as demonstration projects aimed at identifying and slowing the epidemic in high-risk populations. At present, young males of color are at greatest risk. But HIV/AIDS is also increasing among women: in 1985 women made up only 8% of total cases; by 2006 that number had increased to 23%.

HRSA-funded services are intended to reduce the use of costly inpatient care, extend screening and treatment into medically underserved populations, and improve the quality of life for those affected by the epidemic. The program achieves these goals by funding HIV/AIDS care and services through grants to state and local governments, health care providers and community-based organizations.

Funding for metropolitan areas 

Through Part A of the program, HRSA provides funding to Eligible Metropolitan Areas and
Transitional Grant Areas (those hardest hit by the HIV/AIDS epidemic) for a wide range of community-based efforts, such as outpatient health care and case management.

Funding to states 

Through Part B, HRSA provides formula funding to states and territories to strengthen the quality, availability, and organizational structures of their delivery networks. This funding includes the AIDS Drug Assistance Program (ADAP), which supports the provision of prescription
medications. About a third of the Ryan White budget is spent on ADAP.

Funding to communities 

Through Part C, HRSA grants support public and private non-profit providers (such as community and migrant health centers, faith-based organizations, hospitals and university medical centers, and city and county health departments) for outpatient early-intervention services and capacity-building.

As an example of what is possible, in 1989 Pernessa C. Seele worked with major religious leaders, such as Dr. Frederick B. Williams and Dr. Wyatt Tee Walker and their congregations in Harlem, New York, to create the first Harlem Week of Prayer for Healing of AIDS. She doubled the number of congregations the next year, and incorporated as "The Balm in Gilead, Inc." The non-profit now provides educational and technical assistance as a center for public health through faith communities, with some funding from the US Centers for Disease Control in Atlanta. Beginning with organizing congregations in prayers, Seele and her staff work with them to provide education and work to prevent HIV/AIDS, as well as to provide faith community support to patients and families. They have involved 10,000 congregations across the United States, as well as establishing model programs in the Caribbean and some nations in Africa.

Funding for women, children and families 

Through Part D, HRSA funds public agencies and private non-profits to build community- and faith-based programs for children, youth, women and families. Part D also provides for a Youth Services Initiative to identify HIV-infected adolescents; bring them into comprehensive, culturally and linguistically sensitive care; and retain them in treatment.

Part F includes the Special Projects of National Significance Program, which provides funding to public and private nonprofit entities to develop innovative models of HIV care for underserved
populations. Part F also includes the Dental Reimbursement Program, the Community-Based Dental Partnership Program and the AIDS Education and Training Centers.

The Ryan White HIV/AIDS Treatment Modernization Act of 2006 

Part A funds eligible metropolitan areas and transitional grant areas. 75% must be spent for core services.

Part B funds states; 75% must be spent for core services.

Part C funds communities for early intervention services; 75% must be spent for core services.

Part D grants support services for women, infants, children and youth.

Part F comprises Special Projects of National Significance, AIDS Education & Training Centers, Dental Programs and Minority AIDS Initiative.

References

External links 
 HRSA HIV/AIDS Bureau Web Site

1990 establishments in the United States
HIV/AIDS organizations in the United States
Health Resources and Services Administration